Sleetmute Airport  is a state-owned public-use airport serving Sleetmute, in the Bethel Census Area of the U.S. state of Alaska.

Facilities 
It has one runway designated 14/32 with a gravel surface measuring 3,100 by 60 feet (945 x 18 m).

Airlines and destinations

References

External links 
 FAA Alaska airport diagram (GIF)

Airports in the Bethel Census Area, Alaska